Michael Borkow is an American producer and screenwriter. He was executive producer for the fourth season of the American sitcom television series Friends from 1997 to 1998.

Borkow was born to Susan, a lawyer in Hewlett Harbor, New York and Stephen Borkow, an orthopedic surgeon in Oceanside, New York and Valley Stream, New York. He attended Harvard University and Columbia University, where he earned a Juris Doctor degree. Borkow began his television career in 1992, writing for the sitcom Flying Blind. He then produced and wrote for the sitcom television series Friends.

Borkow's other television credits include Roseanne, The Bernie Mac Show, How to Be a Gentleman, Friends with Benefits, Clarissa Explains It All, Mom, Welcome to the Family and Malcolm in the Middle. In 1996 he was nominated for a Primetime Emmy Award in the category Outstanding Comedy Series for his work on the television series Friends, along with Betsy Borns, Kevin S. Bright, Adam Chase, David Crane, Alexa Junge, Marta Kauffman, Todd Stevens and Ira Ungerleider. Borkow also produced for the Friends spin-off Joey, after which he took two years out to travel and study Judaism, returning to television work in 2009.

References

External links 

Living people
Place of birth missing (living people)
Year of birth missing (living people)
American male television writers
American television writers
American television producers
American male screenwriters
American comedy writers
20th-century American screenwriters
21st-century American screenwriters
Harvard University alumni
Columbia University alumni
People from The Five Towns, New York